The Immaculate Conception Church in Hawesville, Kentucky, was a historic Roman Catholic church building on Water Street. It was built in 1860, and added to the National Register of Historic Places in 1975.

Its 1975 National Register nomination states:The Hawesville Immaculate Conception Church is an example of the determination of a small but devout religious group to build and maintain a church. The early people of this church maintained it without the guidance of a permanent priest. They worked until they had constructed a building in which to worship. The building was small and simple but surprisingly monumental, without any striking decoration, except for the traditional stained glass windows and the intrinsic beauty of the stone of which it was constructed. The church building expressed the simple dignity of a people whose religion was the focal point of their community as well as spiritual life.

The more modern church building which replaced it has subsequently been deconsecrated;  River Valley Behavioral Health now occupies the site of the former Immaculate Conception Church, which has not been removed from the Register despite the demolition of the original, historic building.  The congregation still exists, meeting in a different facility in the Hawesville area.

References

Roman Catholic churches in Kentucky
Churches on the National Register of Historic Places in Kentucky
Roman Catholic churches completed in 1860
National Register of Historic Places in Hancock County, Kentucky
Roman Catholic Diocese of Owensboro
19th-century Roman Catholic church buildings in the United States
1860 establishments in Kentucky
Former buildings and structures in Kentucky
Demolished but still listed on the National Register of Historic Places